Mahoba Junction railway station is a major railway station of Bundelkhand region in Mahoba district, Uttar Pradesh. Its code is MBA. It serves Mahoba city. The station is a Category A station of Jhansi railway division of the North Central Railway zone.

The Mahoba–Khajuraho branch line was inaugurated on 26 December 2008 by then Minister of Railways Lalu Prasad Yadav, and the Khajuraho–Jhansi Link Express was the first train run on this track. On the same day Khajuraho railway station also inaugurated. The first train to pass through this rail line was Khajuraho Jhansi Link Express (train no. 230A). Facts about train line:

 Length: 65.15 km
 Cost: 130 crore
 First train: Khajuraho–Jhansi Link Express (train no. 230A)

It is a part of North Central Railway, Allahabad.

Trains 

 Mahakaushal Express
 Bundelkhand Express
 Uttar Pradesh Sampark Kranti Express
 Tulsi Express
 Khajuraho–Kanpur Passenger
 Mahoba–Khajauraho Passenger
 Khajuraho–Udaipur City Express
 Chambal Express
 Howrah–Mathura Chambal Express

References

Railway stations in Mahoba district
Jhansi railway division
Mahoba